Archips grisea, the gray archips moth or black shield leafroller, is a species of moth of the family Tortricidae. It is found in North America (including Alabama, Illinois, Minnesota, Oklahoma, Ontario, Tennessee and Texas).

The wingspan is 18–22  mm.

The larvae feed on Carya species.

References

External links
mothphotographersgroup

Moths described in 1869
Archips
Moths of North America